This page is a list of Scandinavian saints, blesseds, venerables, and Servants of God, as recognized by the Roman Catholic Church. These people were born, died, or lived their religious life in Sweden, Norway, Iceland, Finland, and Denmark.

Saints

Saints before Reformation

 Saint Hallvard Vebjørnsson (ca. 1020 - 1043), Young Layperson of the Diocese of Oslo; Martyr (Lier - Drammensfjord, Sweden)
Canonized: Pre-Congregation
 Saint Henrik of Finland (1100-1156), Apostolic Vicar of Finland; Martyr (England, United Kingdom – Helsinki, Finland)
Canonized: Pre-Congregation
 Saint Ingrid of Skänninge (d. 1282), Professed Religious of the Dominican Nuns (Skänninge, Sweden)
Canonized: Confirmation of Cult
 Saint Knud IV of Denmark (ca. 1042–1086), Married Layperson of the Diocese of Copenhagen; King of Denmark (Odense, Denmark)
Canonized: April 19, 1101 by Pope Paschal II
 Saint Knud Lavard (1096-1131), Layperson of the Diocese of Copenhagen; Martyr (Roskilde – Zealand, Denmark)
Canonized: November 8, 1169 by Pope Alexander III
 Saint Kjeld of Viborg (ca. 1100–1150), Professed Priest of the Canons Regular of Saint Augustine (Viborg, Denmark)
Canonized: July 11, 1189 by Pope Clement II
 Saint Rögnvald Kali Kolsson (ca. 1100–1158), Married Layperson of the Diocese of Oslo (Jæren, Norway – Scotland, United Kingdom)
Canonized: March 4, 1192 by Pope Celestine III
 Saint Helena of Skövde (d. 1160), Married Layperson of the Diocese of Stockholm (Skövde, Sweden)
Canonized: 1164 by Pope Alexander III
 Saint Guillaume of Æbelhot (1125-1203), Professed Priest of the Canons Regular of Saint Augustine (Paris, France – Hillerød, Denmark)
Canonized: January 21, 1224 by Pope Honorius III
 Saint Vilhelm of Roskilde (d. ca. 1073), Bishop of Roskilde (Zealand, Denmark)
Canonized: January 21, 1224 by Pope Honorius III
 Saint Øystein Erlendsson (d. 1188), Archbishop of Nidaros (Trøndelag, Norway)
Canonized: January 26, 1229 by Pope Gregory IX
 Saint Brigitta Birgersdotter (Bridget of Sweden) (ca. 1303–1373), Founder of the Order of the Most Holy Saviour (Bridgettines) (Uppland, Sweden – Rome, Italy)
Canonized: October 7, 1391 by Pope Boniface IX
 Saint Katarina Ulfsdotter (Catherine of Vadstena) (ca. 1332–1381), Professed Religious of the Order of the Most Holy Saviour (Bridgettines) (Vadstena, Sweden)
Canonized: March 22, 1484 by Pope Innocent VIII
 Saint Brinolfo Algotsson (ca. 1240–1317), Bishop of Skara (Västergötland – Skara, Sweden)
Canonized: August 16, 1492 by Pope Alexander VI

Saints after Reformation

Saint Willehad van Deem (1482-1572), Professed Priest of the Franciscan Friars Minor; Martyr (Schleswig-Holstein, Denmark – (South) Holland)
Beatified: November 24, 1675 by Pope Clement X
Canonized: June 29, 1867 by Pope Pius IX
Saint Thorlak Thorhallsson (1133-1193), Bishop of Skálholt (Fljótslíð – Skálholt, Iceland)
Beatified: Confirmation of Cult
Canonized: January 14, 1984 by Pope John Paul II
Saint Maria Elisabetta Hesselblad (1870-1957), Founder of the Bridgettines (Re-established) (Västra Götaland, Sweden – Rome, Italy)
Declared "Venerable": March 26, 1999
Beatified: April 9, 2000 by Pope John Paul II
Canonized: June 5, 2016 by Pope Francis

Blesseds
Blessed Hemming of Turku (d. 1366), Bishop of Åbo (Uppsala, Sweden - Turku, Finland)
Beatified: Confirmation of Cult
Blessed Niels Steensen [Stensen] (1638-1686), Titular Bishop of Titiopolis (Copenhagen, Denmark – Schwerin, Germany)
Declared "Venerable": January 12, 1984
Beatified: October 23, 1988 by Pope John Paul II

Venerable

Venerable Karl Halfdan Schilling (Karl Maria) (1835-1907), Professed Priest of the Barnabites (Oslo, Norway – Hainaut, Belgium)
Declared "Venerable": September 19, 1968

Servants of God
 Servant of God Ellen Aurora Sundström Amman (1870-1932), Married Layperson of the Archdiocese of Munich-Freising (Stockholm, Sweden – Munich, Germany)
 Servant of God Stanisław Komar (1882-1942), Professed Religious of the Jesuits; Martyr (Stockholm, Sweden – KZ Dachau, Germany)
 Servant of God Florence Catherine Flanagan (Maria Caterina) (1892-1941), Professed Religious of the Bridgettine Sisters (England, United Kingdom – Stockholm, Sweden)
 Servant of God Madaleina Catherine Beuchamp Hambriugh (1887-1966), Professed Religious of the Bridgettine Sisters (England, United Kingdom – Rome, Italy)

Candidates for Sainthood

 Zackarias Olai Anthelius (ca. 1583–1624), Nicolaus Campanius (1593-1624) and Göran Bähr (1595-1624), Married Laypersons of the Diocese of Stockholm; Martyrs (Stockholm, Sweden)
 Joséphine Maximilienne de Beauharnais (1807-1876), Married Layperson of the Diocese of Stockholm; Queen of Sweden and Norway (Milan, Italy – Stockholm, Sweden)
 John Jensen (Benedict) (1889-1947), Professed Priest of the Franciscan Friars Minor; Martyr (Køge, Denmark – Jiangsu, China)
 Sigrid Undset Svarstad (1882-1949), Married Layperson of the Diocese of Oslo; Member of the Lay Dominicans (Kalundborg, Denmark – Lillehammer, Norway)
 Jóhannes Gunnarsson (1897-1972), Professed Priest of the Company of Mary, Montfort Missionaries; Apostolic Vicar of Iceland (Reykjavík, Iceland)
 Johannes Erik Müller (Johann Evangelista) (1877-1965), Professed Priest of the Benedictines; Apostolic Vicar of Sweden (Bavaria, Germany – Stockholm, Sweden)
 Brita Collett Paus (1917-1998), Married Layperson of the Diocese of Oslo (Nærøy – Oslo, Norway)
 Johan Castricum (1915-1999), Professed Priest of the Franciscan Friars Minor (Haarlem, Netherlands – Oslo, Norway)
 Georges Celest Stinissen (Wilfrid of the Christ the King) (1927-2013), Professed Priest of the Discalced Carmelites (Antwerp, Belgium – Tågarp, Sweden)
 Göran Degen (1944-2014), Priest of the Diocese of Stockholm (Stockholm, Sweden)
 Gunnel Vallquist (1918-2016), Layperson of the Diocese of Stockholm (Stockholm, Sweden)

See also
 Congregation for the Causes of Saints
 List of saints of Iceland
 List of American saints and beatified people
 List of Brazilian saints
 List of Canadian Roman Catholic saints
 List of Central American and Caribbean saints
 List of Mexican saints
 List of Saints from Africa
 List of Saints from India
 List of Swedish saints
 List of European saints

References

Christian saints of the Middle Ages
Sweden
Norway
Denmark
Scandinavian history